The 2016 Red Bull Air Race of Spielberg was the second round of the 2016 Red Bull Air Race World Championship season, the eleventh season of the Red Bull Air Race World Championship. The event was held at the Red Bull Ring in Spielberg, Austria.

Master Class

Qualification

Round of 14

 Pilot received 2 seconds in penalties.

Round of 8

Final 4

Challenger Class

Results

Standings after the event

Master Class standings

Challenger Class standings

 Note: Only the top five positions are included for both sets of standings.

References

External links

|- style="text-align:center"
|width="35%"|Previous race:2016 Red Bull Air Race of Abu Dhabi
|width="30%"|Red Bull Air Race2016 season
|width="35%"|Next race:2016 Red Bull Air Race of Chiba
|- style="text-align:center"
|width="35%"|Previous race:2015 Red Bull Air Race of Spielberg
|width="30%"|Red Bull Air Race of Spielberg
|width="35%"|
|- style="text-align:center"

Red Bull Air Race World Championship
Spielberg
Red Bull Air Race World Championship